By Reason of Insanity is a two-part 2015 BBC documentary miniseries by Louis Theroux. It focuses on the lives of mental patients at two of Ohio's state psychiatric hospitals Twin Valley Behavioral Healthcare and Summit Behavioral Healthcare who have been sent there after committing crimes but having been acquitted by reason of insanity.

See also
 List of Louis Theroux documentaries

References

External links
By Reason of Insanity (programme page on the BBC website)

2015 in British television
BBC television documentaries
Louis Theroux's BBC Two specials
Television shows set in Ohio
Films set in psychiatric hospitals
BBC travel television series
2010s British television miniseries